Udo Werner (born 26 December 1955) is a former West German slalom canoeist who competed from the late 1970s to the mid-1980s. He won a silver medal in the C-1 team event at the 1979 ICF Canoe Slalom World Championships in Jonquière.

References

1955 births
Living people
German male canoeists
Medalists at the ICF Canoe Slalom World Championships